Dinner Along the Amazon is a book of short stories by Timothy Findley. It was first published by Penguin Canada in 1984

The title story was adapted into a short film in 1996, which starred Arsinée Khanjian, Dan Lett, Claire Rankin and Peter Outerbridge.

Stories
 "Lemonade"
 "War"
 "About Effie"
 "Sometime - Later - Not Now"
 "What Mrs. Felton Knew"
 "The People on the Shore"
 "Hello Cheeverland, Goodbye"
 "Losers, Finders, Strangers at the Door"
 "The Book of Pins"
 "Daybreak at Pisa"
 "Out of the Silence"
 "Dinner Along the Amazon"

Short story collections by Timothy Findley
1984 short story collections
LGBT short story collections